Tyronne Gustavo del Pino Ramos (born 27 January 1991), known simply as Tyronne or Tayron, is a Spanish professional footballer who plays as an attacking midfielder for Nakhon Ratchasima.

Club career
Born in Las Palmas, Canary Islands, Tyronne graduated from UD Las Palmas' youth academy, and made his senior debut with the reserves in the 2010–11 season, in the Tercera División. On 11 December 2010 he appeared in his first match as a professional with the first team, playing the last 12 minutes in a 0–3 home loss against Xerez CD in the Segunda División.

On 31 January 2013, Tyronne was loaned to Barakaldo CF of the Segunda División B. He returned in June, and was definitely promoted to the main squad in July of the following year, but moved on loan to fellow third division club SD Huesca on 1 September 2014. He scored 12 goals in his debut campaign, including two in both legs of the play-off final which granted his team promotion.

Tyronne signed a new three-year contract with Las Palmas on 21 July 2015, and immediately returned to Huesca in a one-year loan deal. He scored his first goal in division two on 20 September, but in a 1–3 home loss against Elche CF.

In July 2016, after returning from loan, Tyronne was granted a place in the first team by manager Quique Setién. He made his debut in La Liga on 28 August of that year, replacing goalscorer Nabil El Zhar in a 5–1 home rout of Granada CF.

On 21 January 2017, Tyronne was loaned to neighbouring second-tier club CD Tenerife until the end of the season. On 15 July he cut ties with Las Palmas, and agreed to a permanent three-year deal with Tenerife just hours later.

References

External links

1991 births
Living people
Footballers from Las Palmas
Spanish footballers
Association football midfielders
La Liga players
Segunda División players
Segunda División B players
Tercera División players
UD Las Palmas Atlético players
UD Las Palmas players
Barakaldo CF footballers
SD Huesca footballers
CD Tenerife players
Super League Greece players
PAS Lamia 1964 players
Tyronne del Pino
Tyronne del Pino
Spanish expatriate footballers
Expatriate footballers in Greece
Spanish expatriate sportspeople in Greece